Lewisham Central is an electoral ward in the London Borough of Lewisham. The ward was created for the 2002 election.

Lewisham Central ward covers Lewisham town centre including the station, as well as Hither Green (west of the railway line) and part of Ladywell and St John's. The ward is mostly in the SE13 postcode district, with a small section in the SE8 district around Armoury Road.

As of the May 2022 election the ward was reduced in geographic size, reflecting population growth around Loampit Vale and the station. There is now a separate ward for Hither Green.

References

External links
MapIt - Lewisham Central ward boundary

Wards of the London Borough of Lewisham